LaTanya Sheffield (born October 11, 1963, in El Cajon, California) is a retired hurdler from the United States, who finished in eight place in the women's 400 metres hurdles final at the 1988 Summer Olympics.

Career
The 1985 NCAA champion running for San Diego State University.  She won the bronze medal in the same event at the 1987 Pan American Games.  Finally after the 2000 Olympic Trials and an illustrious career, LaTanya Sheffield announced her retirement.  After retiring, she lived in Tucson, Arizona, working as the head coach of a track team known as "Pops Tracks Club" and at Canyon del Oro High School.  She is currently coaching at Long Beach State University.

Personal life
Sheffield's daughter, Jaide Stepter Baynes, ran for the University of Southern California where she was a three time Pac-12 Conference champion at 400 meters hurdles. She has also competed in several international competitions for the United States. Her brother Rahn is the head coach at her alma mater, San Diego State.  

Sheffield was an assistant coach for Women's sprints and hurdles for the United States in 2016 and 2020.

References

 LaTanya Sheffield profile at USATF

1963 births
Living people
American female hurdlers
Athletes (track and field) at the 1987 Pan American Games
Athletes (track and field) at the 1988 Summer Olympics
Olympic track and field athletes of the United States
Sportspeople from El Cajon, California
Track and field athletes from California
Pan American Games bronze medalists for the United States
San Diego State Aztecs women's track and field athletes
Pan American Games medalists in athletics (track and field)
Medalists at the 1987 Pan American Games
Long Beach State Beach coaches
21st-century American women
20th-century American women